There are several commercially important hybrids between Fragaria and Comarum species in existence. A name for Fragaria × Comarum is available as × Comagaria Büscher & G.H. Loos in Veroff. [Bohumer Bot. Ver. 2(1): 6. 2010], along with the combination × Comagaria rosea (Mabb.) Büscher & G.H. Loos. 

The first-generation hybrids have been recorded as heptaploid, i.e. with seven sets of chromosomes; four sets of chromosomes came from their octoploid strawberry parent, and three from their hexaploid Comarum parent.

Commercial cultivars
All commercial cultivars resemble strawberries more closely than they do Comarum.  They are all vigorous, and produce runners profusely.

Fragaria grandiflora) with Marsh Cinquefoil, Comarum palustre (formerly Potentilla palustris), followed by backcrossing to strawberry. The plant is grown for ornamental purposes. It has bright pink flowers (in contrast to the white flowers of naturally occurring strawberry species) and it produces a small number of strawberries.
'Franor' (marketed as ) developed as a sport of 'Frel', and features a more intense red color in the flowers.
'Gerald Straley' is a seedling of 'Frel', selected at Heronswood in Washington for its bright red flowers.  It was named after the former curator of the University of British Columbia Botanical Gardens.
'Lipstick' is a variety developed in 1966 from a cross between the Marsh Cinquefoil, Comarum palustre and the Garden Strawberry, Fragaria × ananassa.  It has deep pink to red flowers, and slightly larger, more flavorful berries than 'Frel'.  It, too, is grown for ornamental purposes.

References 

Comarum hybrids
Hybrid plants
Garden plants
Groundcovers
Intergeneric hybrids